Shadow of Intent is an North American deathcore band from Connecticut. They formed in 2013 as a Halo-themed studio project by Ben Duerr and Chris Wiseman. The band's name is a reference to a Covenant ship in the Halo series. They are not signed to a label and have released their albums independently. They have released four studio albums to date, along with two instrumental versions of previous releases, and a deluxe album. Their fourth studio album entitled Elegy was released independently on January 14, 2022.

History

Formation (2013) 
Shadow of Intent was formed in 2013 in Connecticut by vocalist Ben Duerr and guitarist Chris Wiseman. They met playing in separate bands at a local concert. The group was initially formed as a studio project. They were inspired by Halo and the name "Shadow of Intent" came from a ship in the game series bearing the same name. Duerr describes himself as a Halo nerd and stated that their music follows the storyline of the Halo novels.

Inferi Sententia and Primordial (2014–2016) 
The group released their EP Inferi Sententia on July 18, 2014, and debut album Primordial on January 10, 2016. The tracks on both albums were produced via homemade recordings. All of the tracks on Inferi Sententia were re-recorded and featured on Primordial. The drum tracks are programmed on both releases. Keyboard and orchestral samples are also present on these releases.

Duerr was responsible solely for writing and performing the lead vocals during the production process while Wiseman was responsible for all of the remaining songwriting.

New Members, Reclaimer, and The Instrumentals (2016–2017) 
On September 19, 2016, they announced the addition of Matt Kohanowski on drums, marking the end of the group's time as a two-man project. On March 31, 2017, they announced the addition of new members Federico Zuccarelli on guitar and Keith Kohlhepp on bass. This brought the total members of the group to five.

On April 28, 2017, Shadow of Intent released Reclaimer, their first album without programmed drum tracks and the first album to feature a unique player on each instrument. It reached #4 on the iTunes metal chart at debut. It was described by MetalSucks as "nothing short of a triumph of symphonic deathcore".

The band released The Instrumentals on October 20, 2017. The album contained instrumental versions of all of the songs from both of the preceding albums.

Melancholy and Elegy (2018–present) 

In December 2017, Shadow of Intent began touring with their now four-man lineup. They played their first live shows at the Webster Theater in Hartford CT and at the Gramercy Theater in New York City.

On March 30, 2018, they released their first single 'Underneath a Sullen Moon'. This was the first track which was not Halo-themed and their second released track which did not begin with the word 'The.' The band went on their first major tour in the Spring of 2018 supporting Carnifex on their Chaos & Carnage tour headliner. Oceano, Winds of Plague, Archspire, Spite, Widowmaker and Buried Above Ground accompanied Shadow of Intent on this tour. In the Summer of 2018, the band toured alongside Whitechapel, The Black Dahlia Murder, Fleshgod Apocalypse, and Aversions Crown.

On December 14, 2018, the group announced that Anthony Barone would be joining the group as their drummer.

On August 16, 2019, Shadow of Intent released Melancholy which included a remastered version of the aforementioned single as one of the tracks on the album. Francesco Ferrini of Fleshgod Apocalypse contributed to the orchestral work on this album. Melancholy has been described as a concept album depicting mass suicides orchestrated by a demonic goddess. This album marked a departure from writing strictly Halo-themed music. An instrumental version of Melancholy was also released on November 22, 2019.

In the Winter of 2020, the band performed on their first major headlining tour throughout the United States accompanied by Inferi, Signs of the Swarm, and Brand of Sacrifice.

On November 8, 2020, the group announced they were parting ways with Anthony Barone and that Bryce Butler (Contrarian) would be replacing him.

In October 2021, The band announced their fourth studio album, Elegy, for a January 2022 release, which was ultimately met with great critical acclaim. A deluxe edition of the album was released digitally on September 9, 2022, featuring a B-side track titled 'Frozen Tomb' and a cover of Lamb of God's 'Laid to Rest'.

In the Winter of 2022, the band toured the United States alongside Cannibal Corpse, Whitechapel, and Revocation.

Musical style and influences 

Shadow of Intent's symphonic style has been compared to Fleshgod Apocalypse, Ovid's Withering, and Dimmu Borgir. Their stylistic development has been described as incorporating blackened death metal and progressive metal elements in their Melancholy release. The group has demonstrated a penchant for instrumentals, not only releasing instrumental versions of all of their albums, but also including at least one instrumental track on nearly every album release (The Aftermath in Jat-Krula track from Primordial features a minor vocal part despite being mostly instrumental).

Members 

Current

 Ben Duerr –  lead vocals (2013–present)
 Chris Wiseman – guitars, backing vocals, programming, clean vocals (2013–present) 
 Andrew Monias – bass, backing vocals (2018–present) 
 Bryce Butler – drums (2020–present) 

Former
 Matt Kohanowski – drums (2016–2018)
 Keith Kohlhepp – bass (2017–2018)
 Federico Zuccarelli – guitars (2017)
 Anthony Barone – drums (2018–2020)

Timeline

Discography 
Studio albums

Instrumental album versions
The Instrumentals (2017)
Melancholy [Instrumentals] (2019)

EPs
Inferi Sententia (July 18, 2014)

Singles
"Underneath a Sullen Moon" (March 30, 2018)
"Intensified Genocide" (July 30, 2021)

References 

American deathcore musical groups
Musical groups established in 2013
2013 establishments in Connecticut